May Allah Bless France! is a French biographical drama film, released in 2014. The directorial debut of French hip hop musician Abd al Malik, the film is a dramatization of his own childhood memoir Qu'Allah bénisse la France, which was first published in 2004.

The film stars Marc Zinga as the young al Malik.

Cast 
 Marc Zinga as Régis
 Sabrina Ouazani as Nawel
 Larouci Didi as Samir
 Mickaël Nagenraft as Mike
 Matteo Falkone as Pascal
 Stéphane Fayette-Mikano as Bilal
 Mireille Perrier as Miss Schaeffer
 Gianni Giardinelli as The gangster

Accolades 
The film won the FIPRESCI Discovery Prize at the 2014 Toronto International Film Festival.

References

External links
 

2014 films
2014 biographical drama films
French biographical drama films
2014 directorial debut films
2014 drama films
2010s French films